Lomatium cous (cous biscuitroot) is a perennial herb of the family Apiaceae. The root is prized as a food by the tribes of the southern plateau of the Pacific Northwest. Meriwether Lewis collected a specimen in 1806 while on his expedition.

It is called x̣áwš in the Sahaptin language, and qáamsit (when fresh) and qáaws (when peeled and dried) in the Nez Perce language. 

It is called shappelell by the Chinooks: "... and a kind of bisquit, which the natives make of roots called by them shappelell." -- Meriwether Lewis, Friday, January 9th, 1806. From The Definitive Journals of Lewis & Clark, Down the Columbia to Fort Clatsop. Volume 6 of the Nebraska Edition. Gary E. Moulton, Editor. University of Nebraska Press, Lincoln, 1990.

References

External links

cous
Flora of the Northwestern United States
Endemic flora of the United States
Plants used in Native American cuisine
Taxa named by John Merle Coulter
Flora without expected TNC conservation status